Paul Hélène Marie Joseph Sartorius (20 September 1912 – 13 February 2002) was a French field hockey player who competed in the 1936 Summer Olympics. He was born in Roubaix and is the nephew of Émile Sartorius.

Sartorius was a member of the French field hockey team, which finish fourth in the 1936 Olympic tournament. He played four matches as forward.

References

External links

profile

1912 births
2002 deaths
French male field hockey players
Olympic field hockey players of France
Field hockey players at the 1936 Summer Olympics